The Second Dudley Senanayake cabinet was the central government of Ceylon led by Prime Minister Dudley Senanayake in 1960. It was formed in March 1960 after the parliamentary election and it ended in July 1960 after the opposition's victory in the parliamentary election.

Cabinet members

References

Cabinet of Sri Lanka
Ministries of Elizabeth II
1960 establishments in Ceylon
1960 disestablishments in Ceylon
Cabinets established in 1960
Cabinets disestablished in 1960